The sharp-snouted piranha (Serrasalmus sanchezi) is a species of serrasalmid endemic to Peru. It is part of the S. rhombeus complex. It reaches a maximum size of around 7 inches (18 cm).  Individuals often exhibit a red throat, similar to that of Pygocentrus nattereri. It is also known as ruby-throated diamond piranha or "ruby-red piranha"; the latter name is also used for the speckled piranha (S. spilopleura).

In the aquarium
It is a vicious fin biter and must be kept alone. However some people have had limited success with keeping these fish in a group. It requires a minimum of a 30" x 12" tank.

External links
 
 Oregon Piranha Exotic Fish Exhibit website

Serrasalmidae
Piranhas
Freshwater fish of Peru
Fishkeeping
Fish described in 1964